Jesús María 'Chus' Herrero Gómez (born 10 February 1984) is a Spanish professional footballer who plays for SD Tarazona as a central defender.

Club career
Herrero was born in Zaragoza, Aragon. A product of Real Zaragoza's youth academy, he made his debut with the first team on 27 October 2005, coming on as a 39th-minute substitute in a 1–1 home draw against Racing de Santander, but spent the vast majority of the season playing with the B-side.

From 2006 to 2008, Herrero appeared in ten La Liga games each, as Zaragoza was relegated in the second campaign. He contributed more significantly to help the club return to the top flight after just one year, but would be released in July 2009, moving to FC Cartagena (recently promoted to the second division).

Herrero continued competing in the second level in the following years, representing Girona FC, Real Valladolid, UE Llagostera, Albacete Balompié and Córdoba CF.

Career statistics

Club

References

External links

1984 births
Living people
Footballers from Zaragoza
Spanish footballers
Association football defenders
La Liga players
Segunda División players
Segunda División B players
Real Zaragoza B players
Real Zaragoza players
FC Cartagena footballers
Girona FC players
Real Valladolid players
UE Costa Brava players
Albacete Balompié players
Córdoba CF players
SD Tarazona footballers
Cypriot First Division players
Anorthosis Famagusta F.C. players
Spanish expatriate footballers
Expatriate footballers in Cyprus
Spanish expatriate sportspeople in Cyprus